Leonie Kullmann (born 26 August 1999) is a German swimmer. She competed in the women's 4 × 200 metre freestyle relay event at the 2016 Summer Olympics. She is attending and competing in swimming at the University of Alabama. She qualified to represent Germany at the 2020 Summer Olympics.

References

External links
 

1999 births
Living people
German female swimmers
Olympic swimmers of Germany
Swimmers at the 2015 European Games
Swimmers at the 2016 Summer Olympics
Swimmers at the 2020 Summer Olympics
Place of birth missing (living people)
European Games medalists in swimming
European Games silver medalists for Germany
European Games bronze medalists for Germany
German female freestyle swimmers
Swimmers from Dresden
20th-century German women
21st-century German women